Have a Good Time But Get Out Alive! is a studio album by the Iron City Houserockers. Although well-received critically, commercial success eluded the Iron City Houserockers outside of the rust belt.  Among the strongest tracks are the title track, "Don't Let Them Push You Around", "We're Not Dead Yet", the two-part medley of "Old Man Bar" and Junior's Bar", and "Rock Ola" - Grushecky's first truly competent ballad.

Background
According to the liner notes present on the 1999 and 2020 reissues, E Street Band guitarist Steven Van Zandt produced and arranged five songs ("Junior's Bar", "Angela", "Running Scared", "Blondie", and "Don't Let Them Push You Around"), assisted in re-writing "Blondie" from its original version, and played lead guitar on "Junior's Bar" before leaving due to creative differences with Ian Hunter and Mick Ronson.  The version of "Junior's Bar" released as a single contains an entirely different vocal track than the album version.  This version was only available on the original 1980 vinyl single until it was reissued on CD on the 1992 compilation Pumping Iron & Sweating Steel: The Best Of Iron City Houserockers by Rhino Records.

The album was reissued on CD in remastered form for its 40th anniversary in 2020 by Cleveland International Records with a bonus CD of previously unreleased outtakes and demos.

Track listing

Side one
"Have a Good Time (But Get Out Alive)" (Joe Grushecky)  – 3:49
"Don't Let Them Push You Around" (Grushecky) – 2:23
"Pumping Iron" (Grushecky) – 3:54
"Hypnotized" (Grushecky, Gil Snyder) – 3:20
"Price of Love" (Grushecky, Snyder) – 4:04
"Angela" (Grushecky) – 3:17

Side two
"We're Not Dead Yet" (Dan Beck, Grushecky, Snyder) – 3:01
"Blondie" (Grushecky) – 2:44
"Old Man Bar" (Bob Boyer, Eddie Britt, Snyder) – 3:14
"Junior's Bar" (Britt, Grushecky, Snyder) – 4:17
"Runnin' Scared" (Grushecky, Art Nardini, Snyder) – 3:49
"Rock Ola" (Grushecky) – 2:52

40th Anniversary Edition Bonus Tracks
"Have a Good Time (But Get Out Alive)" (Demo) (Grushecky) - 5:06
"Don't Let Them Push You Around" (Demo) (Grushecky) – 6:20
"Pumping Iron" (Demo) (Grushecky) – 4:11
"Don't Stop the Music" (Demo) (Grushecky) - 3:47
"Angela" (Demo) (Grushecky) – 3:18
"Price of Love" (Demo) (Grushecky, Snyder) – 3:57
"Hold Out" (Demo) (Grushecky) - 3:48
"Rock Ola" (Demo) (Grushecky) – 3:13
"Struggle & Die" (Demo) (Grushecky, Beck) - 5:03
"Rock Ola" (Extended) (Grushecky) – 4:27
"Charlena" (Grushecky) – 2:40
"Runnin' Scared" (Demo) (Grushecky, Nardini, Snyder) – 2:44
"Runnin' Scared" (Alternate) (Grushecky, Nardini, Snyder) – 3:54
"Hypnotized" (A Work in Progress) (Grushecky, Snyder) – 7:48
"Rooster Blues" (J.D. Miller) - 3:02
"Doo Wah Diddy" (Jeff Barry, Ellie Greenwich) - 1:44

"Hypnotized" was produced by Ian Hunter. "Don't Let Them Push You Around", "Angela", "Blondie", "Junior's Bar" and "Runnin' Scared" were arranged by Steven Van Zandt.

Personnel
Iron City Houserockers
Joe Grushecky - lead vocals, guitar
Eddie Britt - guitar, background vocals
Art Nardini - bass guitar
Gil Snyder - keyboards, background vocals, lead vocals on "Old Man Bar", cover design
Ned E. Rankin - drums
Marc Reisman - harmonica, background vocals
with:
Tommy Mandel – organ on "Price of Love"
Mick Ronson – piano on "Rock Ola", mandolin on "Old Man Bar"
Steven Van Zandt - guitar on "Junior's Bar"
Joey Miskulin – accordion on "Old Man Bar"
Ian Hunter – guitar, background vocals, piano on "Hypnotized"
Roy Martin – background vocals on "Have a Good Time"
Ellen Foley – background vocals on "Junior's Bar"

Chart performance

References

External links 
 Joe Grushecky's official web site
 Rock's So Tough - Iron City Houserockers

1980 albums
Iron City Houserockers albums
Albums produced by Mick Ronson
Albums produced by Steven Van Zandt
MCA Records albums